The 1995 Asian Fencing Championships were held in Seoul, South Korea from 2 August to 8 August 1995.

Medal summary

Men

Women

Medal table

References

External links
Official website

Asian Fencing Championships
Asian Fencing Championships
International fencing competitions hosted by South Korea
Asian Fencing Championships